The Fence River is a  river in Iron County, Michigan, in the United States. It is a tributary of the Michigamme River, joining it in the Michigamme Reservoir.

The name of Fence River is derived from a translation of the Indian word mitchigan, referring to a wooden fence constructed near its banks by the Indians for catching deer.

See also
List of rivers of Michigan

References

Michigan  Streamflow Data from the USGS

Rivers of Michigan
Rivers of Iron County, Michigan
Tributaries of Lake Michigan